Tervo is a Finnish surname. Notable people with the surname include:

Jari Tervo (born 1959), Finnish author
Krista Tervo (born 1997), Finnish athlete
Penna Tervo (1901–1956), Finnish politician
Trace Tervo (born 1962), United States Virgin Islands sailor

Finnish-language surnames